Off Screen is a 2005 Dutch thriller directed by Pieter Kuijpers.

Cast
 Jan Decleir - John Voerman
 Jeroen Krabbé - Gerard Wesselink
 Astrid Joosten - Herself
 Marjon Brandsma - Elly Voerman
 Chris Comvalius - Heleen Wagemakers

References

External links 

2005 thriller films
Films directed by Pieter Kuijpers
Dutch thriller films
2000s Dutch-language films